Yevgeny Nechayev (born 29 October 1967) is a Soviet field hockey player. He competed at the 1988 Summer Olympics and the 1992 Summer Olympics.

References

External links
 

1967 births
Living people
Soviet male field hockey players
Olympic field hockey players of the Soviet Union
Olympic field hockey players of the Unified Team
Field hockey players at the 1988 Summer Olympics
Field hockey players at the 1992 Summer Olympics
Place of birth missing (living people)